Gülcan Arslan (born 1 May 1986) is a Turkish actress.

Early life 
Gülcan Arslan was born on 1 May 1986 in Karasu, Turkey. She studied theatre at Sadri Alışık Cultural Center before appearing in various plays and commercials.

Career 
Arslan made her debut with a role on the TRT1 series Sardunya Sokak. In 2008, she was cast in Show TV's Sınıf and in the same year appeared on Kanal D's Hepimiz Birimiz İçin. Later in the same year she got a role on ATV's Gurbet Kuşları. In 2009, she joined the cast of Kafkas. In 2010, she had a recurring role on Show TV's Kahramanlar.

Arslan had her first leading role in the series Her Şeye Rağmen in 2011. In 2012, she was among the main cast of Star TV's Bir Çocuk Sevdim for 39 episodes. In the following year, she became a regular in the 8th season of Arka Sokaklar, portraying Commissioner Leyla Candaş.

In 2014, she had the leading role in the series Günahkar as Saliha. She subsequently portrayed Fahriye Sultan for 14 episodes in the historical drama series Muhteşem Yüzyıl: Kösem. In 2017, she shared the leading role with Engin Akyürek and Fahriye Evcen on the ATV series Ölene Kadar, playing the role of Beril. In 2021, she had a recurring role in the drama series Doğduğun Ev Kaderindir.

Filmography

References

External links 
 
 

Living people
1986 births
Turkish film actresses
Turkish television actresses
People from Karasu